Careless World: Rise of the Last King is the second studio album by American rapper Tyga. It is his first album under a major label after his independent release, No Introduction. Production for the album took place during 2009 to 2012 and was handled by Jess Jackson, Arthur McArthur, Pharrell Williams, Boi-1da, and Noah "40" Shebib, among others. The album was released on February 21, 2012, on Young Money Entertainment, Cash Money Records, and Universal Republic Records. The album endured several release dates due to sampling credits, and experienced a limited release in retail stores due to an uncredited use of Martin Luther King Jr.'s "I've Been to the Mountaintop", which was his last speech before he was assassinated on April 4th, 1968. Despite the limited release, the album received strong digital downloads, and debuted at number four on the US Billboard 200 chart, selling 61,000 copies in its first week. The album has received generally positive reviews from music critics upon release.

Release and promotion

Singles
The album's lead single, "Far Away" featuring Chris Richardson was released on May 17, 2011. The song peaked at number 86 on the US Billboard Hot 100. The album's second single, "Still Got It" featuring Drake was released on October 4, 2011. The song peaked at number 89 on the US Billboard Hot 100.

The album's third single, "Rack City" was released on December 2, 2011. The song has peaked at number 7 on the Billboard Hot 100 and has reached platinum status by the Recording Industry Association of America (RIAA). The album's fourth single, "Faded" featuring Lil Wayne was released on January 13, 2012. The song peaked at number 33 on the US Billboard Hot 100. The album's fifth single, "Make It Nasty" was released on June 26, 2012.

Tour
Tyga announced via his website that he would tour in promotion of his new album. The ‘Careless World’ tour began in Salt Lake City, Utah at the Maverick Center on February 17, 2012 and ended in New Orleans, at the Howlin Wolf on April 15, 2012. In the same month Tyga would go on a world tour in Europe for 2 months.

Critical reception

Careless World: Rise of the Last King received positive reviews from most music critics. At Metacritic, which assigns a normalized rating out of 100 to reviews from mainstream critics, the album received an average score of 64, based on 13 reviews, which indicates "generally favorable reviews". David Jeffries of Allmusic gave the album three and a half stars out of five, saying "Growth since his previous effort is obvious, both for the good (writing skills) and an arguable definition of bad." Joe Colly of Pitchfork Media gave the album a 6.7 out of 10, saying "Twenty-one tracks at nearly one-and-a-half hours is an insane length for an album with this kind of pop instinct. Set aside that complaint, though, and I'm left without much to pick at." Andrew Nosnitsky of Spin gave the album a five out of ten, saying "As a whole, though, Careless World is simply mediocre. Tyga wallows in the sort of joyless, affected seriousness that he hinted at on his Black Thoughts mixtape series."

Anupa Mistry of Now gave the album three out of five stars, saying "Careless World isn’t just Rack City plus 20 filler songs, thanks in large part to a phenomenal production team. The result is a slick, accessible rap record that’s about nine songs too long."  Adam Fleischer of XXL gave the album an XL, saying "For all its highlights—and there are many— Careless World: Rise of the Last King still feels disjointed at moments. Even so, Tyga, still just 22-years-old, is growing as an artist, and reveals that there’s more to him than inescapable club jams, for anyone who may have been doubting. Plus, it sounds good, and that’s reason enough to care about the music of this album’s world." Edwin Ortiz of HipHopDX gave the album three and a half stars out of five, saying "Careless World perfectly reflects Tyga and the creative traits that he possesses. It’s serious when necessary, occasionally triumphant, and impressive enough that you have to consider him a force to be reckoned with. Likewise, it’s flawed, which is an indication that Tyga has the opportunity to elevate his skills."

David Amidon of PopMatters gave the album a four out of ten, saying "Careless World is what it is, and while that may not be much it’s professional and adequate enough that – daunting as its length may be – his fans should be satisfied and his detractors should be relieved to continue having little reason to pay him any mind." Steve Juon of RapReviews gave the album a seven out of ten, saying "At times the album feels bloated and excessive, but Tyga is only 22 years old. He'll learn to pare it down and keep only the best songs on future releases, which will hopefully not be as long delayed as this one was." Monica Herrera of Rolling Stone gave the album two and a half stars out of five, saying "Tyga's strength isn't in introspection, but curation. Pharrell Williams, Wale, Nas and J. Cole all guest, and those who don't are there in spirit: "Do It All" apes Kanye West's "Power," and "Black Crowns" ends with a voicemail message from Mom that would make even Drake squirt."

Controversy
Some controversy was aroused regarding the title track of the album, as Martin Luther King Jr.'s estate wanted to stop the sales of the album due to unauthorized usage of one of his speeches at the end of the album's opening track "Careless World". Tyga then tweeted that the issue had been resolved, and the release date would not be altered. New copies of the album, with the Martin Luther King Jr. speech removed, were shipped to stores.

Commercial performance
Careless World: Rise of the Last King debuted at number four on the US Billboard 200, with first-week sales of 61,000 copies despite a limited release in retail stores due to the uncleared sample recall. As of April 2013, the album has sold 340,000 copies in the US. On March 19, 2020, the album was certified platinum by the Recording Industry Association of America (RIAA) for combined sales and album-equivalent units over a million units in the United States.

Track listing

Notes
 signifies a vocal producer
 "Careless World", "Do It All" and "Love Games" feature additional vocals by Priya Prins.
Sample credits
 "Careless World" contains a sample of "Mado Kara Mieru", written and performed by Christopher Tin; and elements of "Thru The Vibe", written by Robert Haigh, performed by Omni Trio.
 "Do It All" contains elements of "I’d Rather Be With You", written by George Clinton, William Collins and Gary Cooper, performed by Bootsy Collins; and elements of "Citoyen 120", written by Marie Daulne and Sylvie Nawasadio, performed by Zap Mama.
 "Mystic AKA Mado Kara Mieru Interlude" contains a sample of "Mado Kara Mieru", written and performed by Christopher Tin.
 "Let It Show" contains excerpts from "Let’s Make A Baby", written by Kenneth Gamble and Leon Huff, and performed by Billy Paul.

Credits and personnel
Credits adapted from the album booklet.

Performance

Micheal "Tyga" Stevenson – primary artist
Sean "Big Sean"Anderson – featured artist
Trevor "Busta Rhymes" Smith – featured artist
Christopher "Chris Brown" Brown – featured artist
Christopher "Chris Richardson" Richardson – featured artist
Dwayne " Lil Wayne" Carter – featured artist
Nasir "Nas" Jones – featured artist
Onika "Nicki Minaj" Maraj – featured artist
Pharrell Williams – featured artist
Robin Thicke – featured artist
Faheem "T-Pain" Najm – featured artist
Olubowale "Wale" Akintimehin – featured artist
Diana "Wynter Gordon" Gordon – featured artist

Producers

Bryan "Birdman" Williams – executive producer
Dwayne "Lil Wayne" Carter – executive producer
Jermaine "Mack Maine" Preyan – executive producer
Ronald "Slim" Williams – executive producer
Christopher "C.P Dubb" Washington – producer
Cool & Dre – producers
Dijon "DJ Mustard" McFarlane – producer
Donte "Dnyc3" Blacksher – producer
Jess Jackson – producer
Dwane "Key Wane" Weir – producer
Noah "40" Shebib – producer
Pharrell Williams – producer
Priya "Priya Prins" Mariahi – vocal production
Micheal "Tyga" Stevenson – vocal production
Mikely "Mike Free" Adam – producer

Musicians}

Danny Chaimson – guitars
Dane Forrest – grand piano
Hayley Hersh – grand piano, keyboards, guitar
Jess Jackson – drums, keyboards, scratches
Jason James – guitars
Mike Malarkey – guitar, keyboards
Priya "Priya Prins" Mariahi – additional vocals
Pier Luigi Salami – grand piano, keyboards, synth

Technical

Alton "AJ" Bates – engineer
Josh Berg – recording assistant
Joshua Berkman – engineer
Michael "Banger" Cadahia – engineer
Ariel Chobaz – engineer
Andrew Coleman – engineer
Thomas Cullison – recording assistant
David "D.A." Doman – sound design, drum programming
Elizabeth Gallardo – recording assistant
Chris Gehringer – mastering
Serban Ghenea – mixing
John Hanes – Pro Tools engineer
Jess Jackson – engineer, mixing, digital editing
Mike Larson – engineer, digital editing
Eric Racy – mixing
Tim Roberts – mixing assistant
Noah "40" Shebib – engineer
Javier Valverde – engineer
Finis “KY” White – engineer
Kevin "Kev-O" Wilson – engineer

Miscellaneous

Joshua Berkmans – A&R
Sandra Brummels – creative direction
Katina Bynum – product management
Julius Erving – management
Edward Grauer – legal
Pamela Littky – photography

Charts

Weekly charts

Year-end charts

Certifications

References

2012 albums
Tyga albums
Cash Money Records albums
Young Money Entertainment albums
Albums produced by Boi-1da
Albums produced by Cool & Dre
Albums produced by Noah "40" Shebib
Albums produced by Pharrell Williams
Albums produced by Key Wane
Albums produced by DJ Mustard
West Coast hip hop albums